Under the Desert Sky is a live album and DVD of a classical - pop concert by classical Italian tenor Andrea Bocelli. The concert was performed on a specially built floating stage at Lake Las Vegas Resort (near Las Vegas, Nevada) and taped for American television network PBS. It mostly featured songs from Bocelli's previous album, Amore. The package was released on 7 November 2006. It debuted and peaked on the U.S. Billboard 200 at number 11.

The DVD also includes interviews about the Amore album, of Bocelli and the producers, David Foster and Humberto Gatica, and was also nominated for an Emmy.

Track listing
DVD

"Amapola"
"Besame Mucho"
"Somos Novios"
"Canzoni Stonate"
"Pero Te Extraño"
"L'Appuntamento"
"Estate"
"September Morn"
"Can't Help Falling in Love"
"Mi Manchi"
"Jurame"
"Solamente Una Vez"
"Les Feuilles Mortes (Autumn Leaves)"
"Porque Tu Me Acostumbraste"
"Cuando Me Enamoro"
"The Prayer"
"Momentos"
"Because We Believe"

CD

 "Besame Mucho"
 "Cuando Me Enamoro"
 "Estate (feat. Chris Botti)"
 "September Morn"
 "Can't Help Falling in Love" (feat. Katharine McPhee)
 "Canzoni Stonate" (feat. Stevie Wonder)
 "Momentos"
 "Somos Novios"
 "The Prayer" (feat. Heather Headley)

Charts

Weekly charts

Year-end charts

Certifications

See also
 Amore, the album

References

Andrea Bocelli video albums
Live video albums
2006 live albums
2006 video albums
Live albums recorded in the Las Vegas Valley